Heshmatiyeh (also Romanized as Ḩeshmatīyeh; also known as Kooshkak and Kūshkak) is a village in Bahman Rural District, in the Central District of Abadeh County, Fars Province, Iran. At the 2006 census, its population was 1,095, in 242 families.

References 

Populated places in Abadeh County